Arnold Moss (January 28, 1910 – December 15, 1989) was an American character actor. His son was songwriter Jeff Moss.

Early years
Born in Flatbush, Moss was a third-generation Brooklyn native. He attended Brooklyn's Boys High School. His first involvement with acting came when he was in college, after which he joined the Eva Le Gallienne Apprentice Gruup.

Career

Radio 
Moss was an announcer at two Baltimore, Maryland, radio stations, moving to WCAO in 1931 after having worked at WTAM. In 1932, he was the youngest announcer at CBS.

He played Dr. Fabian in Cabin B-13 on CBS radio in 1948-49, played in Cafe Istanbul on ABC radio in 1952, was Ahmed on Stella Dallas, was Philip Cameron in Against the Storm and was the first voice of the character of Ted White on the radio serial, The Guiding Light, from April 1948 to May 1949.

Teaching 
In the early 1930s, Moss taught speech at the Brooklyn branch of City College of New York.

Film 

Moss made two appearances in Bob Hope films, as Hope's Casablanca contact in the espionage spoof My Favorite Spy and as a conniving Venetian doge in Casanova's Big Night. Moss appeared in the feature film The 27th Day (1957) as The Alien. In Kim (1950) he played Lurgan, the shopkeeper and secret spy trainer.

Stage 
Moss's stage career began when he acted and directed for Le Gallienne's Civic Repertory Theatre, with his first production being Peter Pan (1929). He played Prospero in Margaret Webster's 1945 production of Shakespeare's The Tempest for a combined total of 124 performances, the longest run of the play in Broadway history. He appeared in the original Broadway production of the Hal Prince/Stephen Sondheim musical Follies, playing impresario Dimitri Weismann.

Moss also was narrator for orchestras in Boston, Detroit, and Milwaukee.

Television 
Moss appeared in dozens of television programs during the golden age of TV. On November 22, 1950, he starred in "Lord Mountdrago" on Somerset Maugham TV Theatre. He appeared on television in Star Trek (1966) as mysterious actor Anton Karidian, alter-ego of the tyrannical Gov. Kodos of Tarsus IV, in the episode "The Conscience of the King". He also played in The Rifleman as the school teacher, Mr. Griswald, and as Chief Lonespear in Bonanza episode "In Defense of Honor" in 1968. Other television appearances include The Time Tunnel, The Girl from U.N.C.L.E., The Man from U.N.C.L.E., and the anthology series The Alfred Hitchcock Hour, General Electric Theater, Alfred Hitchcock Presents, Suspense, Tales of Tomorrow, Studio One, and Kraft Television Theatre.

Personal life 
Moss married Stella Reynolds, an actress who performed with him in the La Gallienne troupe.

Death
Arnold Moss died from lung cancer at his home in New York City on December 15, 1989. He was 79.

Partial filmography

 Temptation (1946) - Ahmed Effendi
 The Loves of Carmen (1948) - Colonel
 Reign of Terror (a.k.a. The Black Book) (1949) - Fouché
 Border Incident (1949) - Zopilote
 Kim (1950) - Lurgan Sahib
 Quebec (1951) - Jean-Paul Racelle
 Mask of the Avenger (1951) - Colardi
 My Favorite Spy (1951) - Tasso
 Viva Zapata! (1952) - Don Nacio
 Salome (1953)  - Micha
 Casanova's Big Night (1954) - the Doge
 Bengal Brigade (1954) - Rajah Karam
 Jump Into Hell (1955) - General Christian De Castries
 Hell's Island (1955) - Paul Armand
 The 27th Day (1957) - the Alien
 The Rifleman (1960, TV Series) - Stevan Griswald
 Alfred Hitchcock Presents (1958, TV Series) - Dr. Ganderbay
 The Fool Killer (1965) as Reverend Spotts
 Star Trek (1966, TV Series) - Anton Karidian (The Conscience of the King)
 Gambit (1966) - Abdul
 The Time Tunnel (1967, TV Series) - Kalech, High Priest of Jericho (Walls of Jericho)
 The Caper of the Golden Bulls (1967) - Mr Shanari
 Bonanza (1968, TV Series) - Chief Lonespear (In Defense of Honor)
 Serpico (1976, TV Series) - Tiller

References

External links

 
 
 
 

1910 births
1989 deaths
Male actors from New York City
American male film actors
American male television actors
People from Flatbush, Brooklyn
Deaths from lung cancer in New York (state)
20th-century American male actors
Boys High School (Brooklyn) alumni